Sons of the Night is a 1921 German silent film directed by Manfred Noa and starring Tzwetta Tzatschewa, Hans Albers and Ludwig Rex. It premiered at the Marmorhaus in Berlin, and was released in two parts.

The film's sets were designed by the art director Karl Machus.

Cast
 Tzwetta Tzatschewa
 Hans Albers
 Ludwig Rex
 Esther Hagan
 Edmund Löwe
 Robert Scholz
 Wolfgang von Schwindt

References

Bibliography
 Alfred Krautz. International directory of cinematographers, set- and costume designers in film, Volume 4. Saur, 1984.

External links

1921 films
Films of the Weimar Republic
German silent feature films
Films directed by Manfred Noa
German black-and-white films
1920s German films
Films shot at Terra Studios